Barkhera is a town and a nagar panchayat in Pilibhit district in the Indian state of Uttar Pradesh.

Geography

Demographics
At the 2001 Census of India, Barkhera had a population of 9,881 (males 54%, females 46%). Barkhera had an average literacy rate of 41% (70% male; 30% female), lower than the national average of 59.5%. 20% of the population was under 6 years of age. Late Mr. Gopi Krishna Saxena BJP Leader submit himself in jail with Prime Minister Mr. Atal Bihari Bajpai, during jail bharo aandolan in 1977.

Industries in the Area
The town has big industries in its area. There is a sugar Plant of Novel Industries in Berkhera. There is also a Sugar Plant of Bajaj Hindustan Limited and a Thermal Power Plant of Baja Energy Limited in the area.

External links
 Barkhera family Genealogy

References

Cities and towns in Pilibhit district